Vincent Mensah (19 July 1924 – 10 March 2010) was the Catholic bishop of the Diocese of Porto Novo, Benin.

Ordained to the priesthood on 21 December 1952, Mensah was appointed bishop of the Porto Novo Diocese on 21 September 1970 and was ordained on 14 December 1970, retiring on 29 January 2000.

Notes

20th-century Roman Catholic bishops in Benin
1924 births
2010 deaths
Roman Catholic bishops of Porto Novo